Christopher Oywecha is an abstract expressionist artist whose works portray "his perception of the human condition" as abstract interpretations of daily life. He works mainly in oil and acrylic with vibrant, earthy paintings typical of his style. He portrays peoples' faces and emotions, and the events affecting them and their environment.

Oywecha has produced work for UN-related projects and showcased artwork in various institutions in Kenya

Exhibitions 
 1993: Nyuzi Za Maisha (Fabric of Life), at National Museum of Kenya
 1993: Artistic Voices, at French Cultural Centre, Nairobi.
 1994: Art and Poetry, at French Cultural center, Nairobi
 1997: East African Art, at National Museum of Kenya.
 2000: Bomb Terror, at Goethe Institute, Nairobi.
 2002: Several Perspectives, at French Cultural Centre, Nairobi.

References

External links
 http://www.paulsen.co.uk/kianga/oywecha.html

Year of birth missing (living people)
Living people
Abstract expressionist artists
Kenyan artists